"I Mean I Love You" is a song written and recorded by American country music artist Hank Williams Jr. It was released in January 1991 as the fourth single from the album Lone Wolf. The song reached No. 39 on the Billboard Hot Country Singles & Tracks chart.

Chart performance

References

1991 singles
1990 songs
Hank Williams Jr. songs
Songs written by Hank Williams Jr.
Song recordings produced by Barry Beckett
Song recordings produced by Jim Ed Norman
Warner Records singles
Curb Records singles